The 1998 Three Days of De Panne was the 22nd edition of the Three Days of De Panne cycle race and was held on 31 March to 2 April 1998. The race started in Harelbeke and finished in De Panne. The race was won by Michele Bartoli.

General classification

References

Three Days of Bruges–De Panne
1998 in Belgian sport